Perry Stadium may refer to:

Doyt Perry Stadium in Bowling Green, Ohio
Percy Perry Stadium in Coquitlam, British Columbia
Bush Stadium in Indianapolis, Indiana, called Perry Stadium 1931-1941